Kur II - is a Polish coat of arms. It was used by several szlachta families in the times of the Polish–Lithuanian Commonwealth.

History

Blazon
Or a cock Sable. Crest as in the shield

Related coat of arms

 Kur coat of arms

See also
 Polish heraldry
 Heraldry
 Coat of Arms
 List of Polish nobility coats of arms 
 Polish nobility

Sources 
 Tadeusz Gajl 
 Dynastic Genealogy 
 Ornatowski.com 

 http://www.4crests.com/kur-family-crest-coat-arms.html

Polish coats of arms